Brown Township, Ohio, may refer to:

Brown Township, Carroll County, Ohio
Brown Township, Darke County, Ohio
Brown Township, Delaware County, Ohio
Brown Township, Franklin County, Ohio
Brown Township, Knox County, Ohio
Brown Township, Miami County, Ohio
Brown Township, Paulding County, Ohio
Brown Township, Vinton County, Ohio

Ohio township disambiguation pages